Jalkovec is a village in northern Croatia, located southwest of Varaždin. The population of the village in the 2011 census was 1,309.

References

Populated places in Varaždin County